Homeless Sam & Sally also known as Sam & Sally, is an American black comedy film released in 2020 and a television series with the same name released in 2019, directed, produced, and written by Tyrone Evans Clark. The film and series were inspired by Clark’s adolescence and follow a mother, Sally Silver (Margaret Newborn) and her child Sam Silver (Tyrone Evans Clark) who become homeless and find ways to cope with their homelessness.

Plot 
In Los Angeles (Koreatown), a low-income African American family, the Silvers, are struggling to keep up with the rent. Sally Silver takes it upon herself to bargain out of paying the rent with the Landlord Josh (Mehmet Edip) by giving sexual favors. It works for a bit, but later on, Sally and her son Sam Silver are evicted and are forced to live on the streets. Throughout the story, everyone including Silver's friends and enemies see the seriousness of Sam’s mental illness, along with Sally willing to do anything for her child, including spending time in jail.

Cast 

 Tyrone Evans Clark as Sam Silver
 Margaret Newborn as Sally Silver
 Max Aria as The Red Face Creature Thing
 Darnell Baldwin as Officer - Idris
 Camille Calvin - Susie
 Mehmet Edip as Landlord - Josh
 Romeial Hilaire - Foolish
 Eddie Long - Partygoer
 Selene Rojas Alcover - Beth
 Kevin Scarlett - The Creature Thing
 Mark Schaefer - Officer Stokely
 George Sepa - The Creature Thing
 Hariom H.M. Shukla - Partygoer
 I. Vega - Rebecca

Production 
Homeless Sam & Sally – The Movie was originally intended to be a series for Binge Networks, but COVID-19-related production delays and a loss of footage led to the series being edited into a film.

Clark recorded several songs for the film’s soundtrack, including the film’s theme song, “We Gotta Figure It Out,” which he wrote and performed with his co-star, Newborn.

Release 
In 2019, the television series became available on Binge Networks and later, the film was added as well.

The film was released on August 31, 2020 at film festivals throughout the United States. It had its worldwide premiere at the Couch Fest Films festival.

Prior to its release on home video, the film was shown at film festivals such as the IndieX Film Fest, the Asian Film Festival (August 2, 2020), the World London Film Festival, and the Prague International Film Festival.

Reception 
Roger Stone of FilmInk wrote, “This comedy tries to turn a sad story into a laughing matter, and I think they succeeded… With its deep storyline, the movie doesn’t want you to be sad for the characters, but instead sympathize with them and just have fun with their journey.” In The Good Men Project, Eliana Peyton wrote, “The film’s over-the-top scenes [have] the feeling of yearning more hope for the characters, but it still leaves you a little bit of mystery… Tyrone really has an extremely clever storyline and knows the right amount of detail to express without giving too much of the story away.”

Accolades

References 

2020s American comedy television series
2020s American films
2020 black comedy films
American black comedy films